Clarence Linden Garnett Ashby III (born May 23, 1960) is an American actor and director. On television, he portrayed Brett Cooper on the final two seasons of the Fox soap opera Melrose Place (1997–1999) and Sheriff Noah Stilinski on all six seasons of the MTV supernatural drama Teen Wolf (2011–2017). He is also known for portraying Johnny Cage in the 1995 film Mortal Kombat, an adaptation of the video game franchise of the same name.

Early life
Ashby was born in Atlantic Beach, Florida, the son of Eleanor (Johnson), a civic organizer, and Clarence Linden Garnett Ashby Jr., a pharmaceuticals manufacturer. Ashby graduated from The Bolles School, a private school located in Jacksonville, Florida. He attended Fort Lewis College in Durango, Colorado, but dropped out his junior year to pursue an acting career. Ashby studied acting at Neighborhood Playhouse in New York City.

Career
Ashby's first role on television, in 1985, was on the ABC soap opera Loving, where he was the second actor to play the role of Curtis Alden. Soon after, he was cast as Lance Reventlow, the only son of Woolworth heiress Barbara Hutton (played by Farrah Fawcett) in the Golden Globe-winning miniseries Poor Little Rich Girl: The Barbara Hutton Story.

Drawing on his martial arts background, Ashby portrayed Johnny Cage in Mortal Kombat, the 1995 film adaptation of the video game of the same name; the film became a cult classic. He would later return to voice Johnny Cage in the Mortal Kombat 11 video game.

In the second quarter of 1997, Ashby starred in the short-lived ABC drama Spy Game. Later that year, he joined the main cast of Melrose Place as Brett Cooper, a role he had until the start of the seventh season in late 1998. He first appeared on the show in the first season in 1993 as Jo Reynolds's estranged husband Charles, in the episodes "Peanut Butter and Jealousy" and "Single White Sister". He was in the movie Wyatt Earp where he played Morgan Earp, Wyatt Earp's (Kevin Costner) younger brother. He played Cameron Kirsten on The Young and the Restless from 2003 to 2004. He also began playing the role of Paul Hollingsworth on Days of Our Lives in March 2008. 

Ashby also portrayed Beacon Hills' Sheriff and father to Stiles Stilinski (played by Dylan O'Brien) on MTV's Teen Wolf series.

In September 2021, it was announced that a reunion film for Teen Wolf had been ordered by Paramount+, with Jeff Davis returning as a screenwriter and executive producer of the film. The majority of the original cast members, including Ashby, were set to reprise their roles. The film was released on January 26, 2023.

Personal life
Ashby is married to actress Susan Walters. The couple met on the set of Loving in 1983, where she was a regular and he was filming a guest appearance (he would later become a regular cast member in 1985). They have two daughters, Frances Grace (born 1991) and Savannah Elizabeth (born 1992). Ashby has been a student of martial arts on and off since he was 21 and studied Karate, Tae Kwon Do and Kung Fu.

Linden has admitted to previously suffering panic attacks before auditions which threatened to shorten his career.

Filmography

Film

Television

Video games

Director

Awards and nominations

References

External links

1960 births
Living people
American male film actors
American male karateka
American male soap opera actors
American male taekwondo practitioners
American male television actors
Fort Lewis College alumni
Male actors from Jacksonville, Florida
People from Atlantic Beach, Florida
Bolles School alumni